Dacun Township is a rural township in Changhua County, Taiwan.

Geography
Dacun encompasses  and a population of 40,459, including 19,044 males and 17,732 females as of January 2023.

Administrative divisions
The township comprises 16 villages: Baitang, Cunshang, Dacun, Dalun, Daqiao, Fuxing, Gongqi, Guogou, Huangcuo, Jiadong, Jiaxi, Meigang, Nanshi, Pinghe, Tianyang and Xinxing.

Economy
Dacun is Taiwan's largest producer of grapes.

Education
 Dayeh University

Transportation
Dacun Township is served by Dacun Station on the Western Line of the Taiwan Railways.

Notable natives
 George Huang, Magistrate of Changhua County (1981–1989)
 Luo Jye (1925 – 2019) billionaire, founder of Cheng Shin Rubber, the world's ninth largest tire manufacturer. At the time of his death, he was the sixth richest person in Taiwan.

References

External links

  

Townships in Changhua County